Interstate 69 (I-69) is an Interstate Highway that is in the process of being built in the US state of Texas. It is part of a longer I-69 extension known as the NAFTA superhighway, that, when completed, will connect Canada to Mexico. In Texas, it will connect Tenaha and I-69 in Louisiana at the Louisiana border through the eastern part of the state and along the Texas Gulf Coast to Victoria, where it will split into three branches: I-69E to Brownsville, I-69C to Pharr, and I-69W to Laredo. The first segment of I-69 in Texas was opened in 2011 near Corpus Christi. The American Association of State Highway and Transportation Officials (AASHTO) approved an additional  of US 77 from Brownsville to the Willacy–Kenedy county line for designation as I-69, which was to be signed as I-69E upon concurrence from the Federal Highway Administration (FHWA). FHWA approval for this segment was announced on May 29, 2013. By March 2015, a  section of US 59 had been completed and designated as I-69 through Greater Houston. , short segments near the southern terminuses of the three branch routes have also all been completed. These branches are planned to be connected.

Route description
The congressionally designated I-69 corridor begins at the Mexican border with three auxiliary routes:
I-69W begins at the entrance to the World Trade International Bridge, which connects to Mexican Federal Highway 85D (Fed. 85D), near the border in Laredo. It is cosigned with both US 59 and State Highway Loop 20 (Loop 20; Bob Bullock Loop) and extends  to I-35 (which connects to Fed. 85 south of the border). It will continue on US 59 east to George West, where it will intersect I-69C, it will then intersect I-37 east of George West, and it will then continue east to Victoria.
I-69C (with connections to Fed. 97) begins in Pharr at I-2 and is designated for  through Edinburg and cosigned with US 281. It will continue north along US 281 to George West, where it will intersect I-69W and terminate at this point.
I-69E begins just north of the Veterans International Bridge, which connects to both Fed. 101 and Fed. 180, near the border in Brownsville and continues for  through Olmito, where it intersects I-169, and through Harlingen, where it intersects I-2, past Raymondville to the Willacy–Kenedy county line, and cosigned with US 77; it is also cosigned with US 83 from Brownsville to Harlingen. The route will follow the US 77 corridor north to Corpus Christi, where a  segment is already designated as I-69E and cosigned with US 77 and also intersects I-37, and it will then continue north to Victoria.

I-69W and I-69E will merge just south of Victoria, Texas, where mainline I-69 will follow US 59 northeast to Fort Bend County. In Greater Houston, I-69 follows US 59 (Southwest Freeway) from Fort Bend County to the west loop of I-610. I-69 then follows US 59 (Eastex Freeway) from the north loop of I-610 to the Montgomery–Liberty county line. The segment of US 59 inside the I-610 loop, through Downtown Houston, was approved for designation as I-69 by the FHWA on March 9, 2015, and approved for signage as I-69 by the Texas Transportation Commission on March 25, 2015.

I-69 will follow US 59 to the north, serving Cleveland, Shepherd, Livingston, Lufkin, Nacogdoches, and Tenaha. In Tenaha, I-69 will head into Louisiana along the US 84 corridor. The segment of US 59 from Tenaha to Texarkana will be signed as I-369.

History 
The federal legislation designating the south Texas branches as I-69 suggested that these routes may be designated as "I-69E" (east, following US 77), "I-69C" (central, following US 281), and "I-69W" (west, following US 59), the AASHTO Special Committee on Route Numbering rejected the Texas Department of Transportation (TxDOT)'s request for these three designations along the proposed I-69 branches, citing that AASHTO policy no longer allows Interstate Highways to be signed as suffixed routes. Stating that the I-69E, I-69C, and I-69W designations for the three I-69 branches south of Victoria were written into federal law, the initial denial of TxDOT's applications were subsequently overturned by the AASHTO Standing Committee on Highways, and the approval for the I-69E, I-69C, and I-69W branch designations were confirmed by the AASHTO Board of Directors, pending concurrence from the FHWA during the AASHTO Spring Meeting on May 7, 2013. During this same meeting, the section of US 83 between Harlingen and Peñitas was conditionally approved to be designated as I-2, with FHWA concurrence. The US 83 freeway in south Texas was widely anticipated to receive an I-X69 designation instead of I-2. In any case, Texas is proceeding in the same fashion as Indiana, conducting environmental studies for its portion of I-69 in a two-tier process. On June 11, 2008, TxDOT announced they planned to limit further study of I-69 to existing highway corridors (US 59, US 77, US 84, US 281, and State Highway 44 (SH 44)) outside transition zones in the lower Rio Grande Valley, Laredo, Houston, and Texarkana.

Texas originally sought a public–private partnership to construct much of the route through Texas as a privately operated toll road under the failed Trans-Texas Corridor project. However, on June 26, 2008, TxDOT announced that they had approved a proposal by Zachry American and ACS Infrastructure to develop the I-69 corridor in Texas, beginning with upgrades to the US 77 corridor between Brownsville and I-37; the Zachry/ACS plan calls for the majority of the freeway to be toll-free; the only two tolled sections would be bypasses of Riviera and Driscoll.

Original plans for the route included a potential overlap with the "TTC-35" corridor component as well, but the preferred alternative for that component follows I-35 south of San Antonio instead of entering the Lower Rio Grande Valley.

Recent and Future Improvements 
Since July 2011, Texas has been proceeding with upgrading rural sections of US 59, US 77, and US 281 to Interstate standards by replacing intersections with interchanges and converting two-lane stretches to four lanes by adding a second carriageway to the existing roadway and adding one-way frontage roads. Some bypasses will be built around some cities which are being called a relief route.

A stated goal of TxDOT's I-69 initiative is that "existing suitable freeway sections of the proposed system be designated as I-69 as soon as possible". A bill was introduced and passed by the House of Representatives that allows Interstate quality sections of US 59, US 77, and US 281 to be signed as I-69 regardless of whether or not they connected to other Interstate Highways.

In August 2011, TxDOT received approval from the FHWA for a  segment of US 77 between I-37 and SH 44 near Corpus Christi and was approved by AASHTO in October 2011. Officials held a ceremony on December 5, 2011, to unveil I-69 signs on the Robstown–Corpus Christi section. On May 29, 2013, the Robstown–Corpus Christi section of I-69 was resigned as I-69E.

At the May 18, 2012, AASHTO meeting,  of US 59 (Eastex Freeway) from I-610 in Houston (on the loop's northern segment) to Fostoria Road in Liberty County were also approved as ready for I-69 signage, pending concurrence from the FHWA. The FHWA later granted concurrence and with the final approval of the Texas Transportation Commission, the  stretch was officially designated as I-69. It was announced on February 6, 2013, that the FHWA had approved a  segment of US 59 (Southwest Freeway) from I-610 in Houston (on the loop's western segment) to just southwest of Rosenberg; the Transportation Commission gave final approval later that month and signage was erected on April 3, 2013. The remaining segment of the original  submission (the section within Houston between the northern and western sections of I-610) was approved for designation as I-69 by the FHWA on March 9, 2015, and approved for signage as I-69 by the Transportation Commission on March 25, 2015.

The south terminus of the I-69 designation is to be extended to the Fort Bend–Wharton county line. This project is scheduled for completion in 2022. The northern terminus I-69 will be extended to Cleveland. This project was scheduled for completion in by end of 2022, but got delayed to 2023 due to weather and supply chain issues. In the way in Liberty County is the Riggs Cemetery built along construction of the freeway, but TXDOT is preserving it. The cemetery was established in 1892. It will also be extended to Shepherd. That project will begin in 2023 and is scheduled to be completed in 2027.

On May 29, 2013, the Transportation Commission gave approval to naming completed Interstate-standard segments of US 77 and US 281 as I-69. On July 15, 2013, the Interstate markers were unveiled. US 77 through Cameron and Willacy counties are signed as I-69E. That includes  of existing freeway starting at the international boundary in the middle of the Rio Grande in Brownsville and running north past Raymondville. The  of US 281 freeway in Pharr and Edinburg are signed as I-69C.

On November 20, 2014, the Transportation Commission voted to add two new sections totaling  to I-69 in south Texas. The designations were approved by the FHWA and by AASHTO.

On May 24, 2019, both the Texas House of Representatives and the Texas Senate approved a 10-year extension of highway funding needed for I-69.

There is no timeline of when I-69 in Texas will be completed as there no funding to complete it entirely. Various portions of US 59 is being upgraded to interstate standards with some bypasses being constructed. Construction on building a new alignment in Nacogdoches to bypass a interchange began in 2019 and is scheduled to be completed in 2023. A bypass for Diboll is under construction and is scheduled for completion in 2025. The bypass for Corrigan started construction in late 2022 and is scheduled for completion in 2028.

Exit list

Notes

References

External links

 Texas
69
Transportation in Angelina County, Texas
Transportation in Fort Bend County, Texas
Transportation in Harris County, Texas
Roads in Houston
Transportation in Jackson County, Texas
Transportation in Liberty County, Texas
Transportation in Montgomery County, Texas
Transportation in Nacogdoches County, Texas
Transportation in Polk County, Texas
Transportation in Rusk County, Texas
Transportation in San Jacinto County, Texas
Transportation in Shelby County, Texas
Transportation in Victoria County, Texas
Transportation in Wharton County, Texas